"The Premiere" is the 10th and 11th episodes of the third season of the television series The Naked Brothers Band which premiered on April 11, 2009 on Nickelodeon. The episode is in the format of a rockumentary-mockumentary musical episode.

The premise of "The Premiere" is that The Naked Brothers Band Musical Mystery Movie premieres.  It also features guest appearances by Victoria Justice from Zoey 101.

Plot
Everything is finally finished for the premiere of The Naked Brothers Band "Musical Mystery Movie". Now the band has to go through the press release and the red carpet! Nat, hearing about Rosalina wanting to be back in the band, has to decide, along with the rest of the band, whether to keep their new bass player, Kristina, or agree to let Rosalina back in the band. The director that Cooper replaced is still out to get revenge on the Naked Brothers band for firing him as a director.

Plus, the publicist for the movie tells the band that each of them need to bring a date to the premiere with them. Alex thinks his hair can tell the future if you ask it a question, but in reality, can it? Who will Nat choose? Rosalina the love of his life? Or Kristina the girl who was inspired by his music? Plus, what about his date? So he picks all of them. He ends up with all his girl fans as dates along with Rosalina, Victoria Justice, and Kristina. He arrives at the premiere in an ice cream truck.

On the red carpet, Nat shouts out to Victoria Justice that he's available.  Nat tells Rosalina he loves her leaving her confused and then he kisses Kristina after she accidentally spills ice cream on his tuxedo. The film ends with the band performing "Just a Girl I Know".

Cast

References

External links
 
 

2009 American television episodes
The Naked Brothers Band (TV series) episodes